Konradowo  is a village in the administrative district of Gmina Otyń, within Nowa Sól County, Lubusz Voivodeship, in western Poland.

References

Villages in Nowa Sól County